Edition VFO, Verein für Originalgraphik, is a non-profit arts institution, edition publisher and gallery based in Zürich.

History 
The Kunstverein was founded in 1948 as a non-profit "association for the promotion of art". The purpose of the association is to foster traditional and contemporary printing techniques. The editions, printed and published by Edition VFO are selected by a jury. According to the statute, the Kunstverein promotes the broad interest in the fine arts and at the same time encourages artists to print graphic works with classic printing techniques. The Edition VFO currently counts (2020) as an art association around 800 members.

Exhibitions and Editions 
The association has published numerous editions with Swiss and international artists maintaining affordable prices in recent decades. Edition VFO publishes up to 60 editions a year and shows them in various exhibitions. Many works have been exhibited and presented in collaboration with Swiss museums and institutions, such as Bündner Kunstmuseum, Chur or Museum Tinguely, Basel. Among others, Edition VFO has published works and did exhibitions with artists such as Pipilotti Rist, Leiko Ikemura, Richard Deacon, Roman Signer, Günther Förg, Shirana Shahbazi, Annelies Strba, Tony Cragg, Keren Cytter, Sylvie Fleury, Julian Charrière or Olivier Mosset in recent years.

Publications 
David Khalat, Bernard Vienat (ed.): La métamorphose de l'art imprimé. Zeitgenössische westschweizer Editionen und serielle Unikate. Verlag für Moderne Kunst Wien 2020, .

Hans Eggenberger, Annemarie Bucher, Hans Egli (ed.): Verein für Originalgraphik 1948-1998. Zurich 1998, .

H. and H. Zschokke: Verein für Originalgraphik 1948-1982 (Catalog Raisonne of works). Orell Füssli, Zurich 1982.

References 

Art museums and galleries in Zurich
Contemporary art galleries in Switzerland
Printmaking groups and organizations
Culture of Zürich